Lovecraft & Witch Hearts is a compilation album by English extreme metal band Cradle of Filth, released on 13 May 2002 by record label Music for Nations.

Content 

It is described in Dani Filth's sleeve notes as "a favoured grimoire of tracks coupled with the rare and unreleased; rather a 'mess of' than a 'best of'..." It was designed to round off Cradle of Filth's contract with Music for Nations before their short-lived signing to Sony Records.

Disc one (Lovecraft) consists of album tracks from their Music for Nations back catalogue (although the Cruelty and the Beast tracks "Beneath the Howling Stars" and "Cruelty Brought Thee Orchids" are remixes by longtime band studio collaborator Mike Exeter). Disc two (Witch Hearts) consists of extra tracks culled from limited and import editions of their MFN releases (e.g. the two-disc version of Cruelty and the Beast; however, the versions on here are slightly altered), along with some remixes.

Release 

Lovecraft & Witch Hearts was released on 13 May 2002. It reached number 95 in the UK Albums Chart.

The album was reissued in 2012 by record label The End.

Track listing

Charts

References

External links 

 

Cradle of Filth albums
2002 greatest hits albums
Music for Nations compilation albums